The Incheon Bridge is a reinforced concrete cable-stayed bridge in South Korea. At its opening in October 2009, it became the second bridge connection between Yeongjong Island and the mainland of Incheon.  The Incheon Bridge is South Korea's longest spanning cable-stayed bridge. In comparison, it is the world's tenth longest cable-stayed bridge as of January 2019.

The bridge provides direct access between Songdo and Incheon International Airport, reducing travel time between them by up to one hour.

The section of the bridge crossing the sea, whose concessionaire is Incheon Bridge Corporation, is funded by the private sector.
Korea Expressway Corporation and the Korean Ministry of Land, Transport and Maritime Affairs (MLTM) managed the project.

The bridge is located to the south of the Yeongjong Bridge, which was the first bridge connection between Yeongjong Island and the mainland.

Construction
The main design and build contractor was Samsung C&T Corporation JV (Daelim, Daewoo, GS, Hanjin, Hanwha, Kumho). The  highway project consisted of government-built sections at three ends and a  section in the middle built with private capital.

The bridge has a cable stayed section over the main sea route to Incheon port. Adjacent to the center section are approach spans consisting of a series of  balanced cantilever spans. Lower-level viaducts consisting of  spans connect to land at each end of the bridge. An arch span is located on the Incheon side of the bridge, which consists of two red-colored identical arches on each side of the bridge deck.

Design
Because the bridge is situated in a known seismically-active region, a seismic design of the substructure was adopted.

At 12.3 km long, with a main cable stayed span of 800m, the new Incheon Bridge is one of the five longest of its type in the world. Its 33.4m wide steel/concrete composite deck carries six lanes of traffic 74 m above the main shipping route in and out of Incheon port and links Incheon International Airport on Yeongjong Island to the international business district of New Songdo City and the metropolitan districts of South Korea's capital, Seoul. The cable stayed section of the crossing is 1,480 m long, made up of five spans measuring 80 m, 260 m, 800 m, 260 m and 80 m respectively: height of the inverted-Y main towers is 230.5 m. A 1.8 km approach span and 8.7 km viaduct complete the crossing, both constructed with precast prestressed concrete box girder decks. Foundations are drilled piles 3 m in diameter. In order to accommodate movement between the bridge decks, the Incheondaegyo was equipped with expansion joints weighing up to 50 tons per joint.

Notable incidents
On May 20, 2010, twelve passengers were killed in a bus crash at the bridge.

In popular media
 Rough Cut: The bridge, under construction, was used as a backdrop for a fight sequence and appeared in promotional images for the film

Gallery

References

External links

 Official Website
 Roadtraffic Technology
 
  DYWIDAG Post-Tensioning System incorporated into Korea's largest bridge construction project

Cable-stayed bridges in South Korea
Arch bridges in South Korea
Bridges completed in 2009
Songdo International Business District
Toll bridges in South Korea
Bridges in Incheon
Cross-sea bridges in Asia